Vincenzo Di Benedetto (12 January 1934 – 19 or 20 July 2013) was an Italian classical philologist.

Life 
Born to the tailor Saverio Di Benedetto and his wife Maria Gaetana (née Santoro) he grew up in Saracena (Calabria) and acquired a sound knowledge of Latin and Classical Greek at the Liceo Classico in Castrovillari. Having received a scholarship from the Scuola Normale Superiore, he went on to study from 1952 to 1958 in Pisa and Oxford (Corpus Christi College). Apart from his academic mentors, he also acknowledged the influence of his friend, Latinist Sebastiano Timpanaro and his mother, historian of philosophy Maria Timpanaro Cardini. From 1969 onwards until his retirement in 2006 he taught Greek literature at the University of Pisa, and, from 1971 until 1993, Classical Philology at the Scuola Normale. In 1996, he was diagnosed with Parkinson's disease and used a wheelchair since 2006. Despite this, he managed to continue working until shortly before his death.

On May 14, 1972, he married philologist Diana Fiorini; their son Saverio was born on November 27, 1972.

Achievements 
His areas of expertise included the history of Greek grammar, Greek tragedy, the so-called Hippocratic Corpus, Sappho, and the Homeric epics, but also the works of Dante, Foscolo, and Manzoni. He published numerous monographs as well as bilingual editions, intended both for a larger public and experts. A household name in his native Italy, he never quite achieved the international recognition he deserved, although his last major work, a bilingual commented edition of the Odyssey (2010), received excellent reviews, such as by Barbara Graziosi, who referred to the book as "a monumental achievement“. Even the selection of his minor works, titled Il richiamo del testo and published by Riccardo Di Donato in 2007, takes up four weighty volumes, containing some of his most important insights, such as his proof that Aristotle, when quoting his sources, had been far more reliable than had hitherto been assumed.

Selection of Works 
 La tradizione manoscritta euripidea, Padua 1965, ASIN: B0063Y3D5G.
 Euripidis Orestes, introduzione, testo critico, commento e appendice metrica a cura di V. Di Benedetto, Florence 1965.
 Euripide: teatro e società, Turin 1971, .
 L'ideologia del potere e la tragedia greca. Ricerche su Eschilo, Turin 1978, .
 with Alessandro Lami: Filologia e marxismo. Contro le mistificazioni, Naples 1981, .
 Sofocle, Florence 1983 (2nd edition 1988), .
 Il medico e la malattia. La scienza di Ippocrate, Turin 1986, .
 with Franco Ferrari: Saffo, Poesie, Introduzione di Vincenzo Di Benedetto. Traduzione e note di Franco Ferrari, Milan 1987, .
 Lo scrittoio di Ugo Foscolo, Turin 1990, .
 Ugo Foscolo, il sesto tomo dell' Io, edizione critica e commento a cura di V. Di Benedetto, Turin 1991, .
 Nel laboratorio di Omero, Turin 1994 (considerably enlarged edition 1998), .
 La tragedia sulla scena: la tragedia greca in quanto spettacolo teatrale (with Enrico Medda). Turin 1997, .
 Guida ai Promessi sposi. I personaggi, la gente, le idealità, Milan 1999, .
 Euripide, Le Baccanti, premessa, introduzione, traduzione, costituzione del testo originale e commento a cura di V. Di Benedetto, appendice metrica di E.Cerbo, Milan 2004, .
 Omero, Odissea, Milan 2010, .

References 

1934 births
2013 deaths
Neurological disease deaths in Tuscany
Deaths from Parkinson's disease
Italian classical philologists
Academic staff of the Scuola Normale Superiore di Pisa
Academic staff of the University of Pisa
University of Pisa alumni
Scuola Normale Superiore di Pisa alumni